Isola delle Correnti Lighthouse is an active lighthouse located 

Description
When the Marina Militare automated the lighthouse, the keeper's house was abandoned and went in ruin, so in the 2000s. a new fibreglass tower was set up in front of the old. 
The lighthouse is completely automated and managed by the Marina Militare with the identification code number 2926 E.F.

See also
 List of lighthouses in Italy

References

External links

 Servizio Fari Marina Militare

Lighthouses in Italy
Buildings and structures in Sicily